Scipio Township is one of twenty-one townships in LaPorte County, Indiana. As of the 2010 census, its population was 4,570 and it contained 1,910 housing units.

Camp Colfax
During the Civil War, Camp Colfax was located about two blocks north of the location of the marker.  It was a plot of ground at the west edge of La Porte, (at this time, the City of La Porte's west boundary was L Street) beyond L Street and a small lake in existence then which became known as Camp Lake, and bounded on the north by Second Street.

The 9th Regiment organized and mustered into service at Indianapolis, 25 April 1861, for three months service. At the end of the three months service, the 9th returned and went into rendezvous at Camp Colfax, under the command of Col. Robert H. Milroy.  (Abstracted from information in files of La Porte County Historical Society, Inc., La Porte, IN)

The camp was named in honor of Schuyler Colfax, U. S. Representative 1855-1869 and Vice-President 1869–1873.

Geography

Door Village is located in Scipio Township.

References

External links
 Indiana Township Association
 United Township Association of Indiana

Townships in LaPorte County, Indiana
Townships in Indiana